George Mason (6 May 1890 in Des Moines, Iowa – 13 September 1918 in Bordeaux, France) was an American racecar driver. A Red Cross ambulance driver in World War I, Mason was killed in action.

Mason has the unique distinction of being the first and, until Greg Ray in the 2003 race, only driver to field a car in the Indy 500 carrying the number 13 over the first 86 years of the event. From 1926–2002, usage of #13 was not permitted, and generally avoided by competitors due to superstitions.

Indianapolis 500 results

References

1890 births
1918 deaths
American casualties of World War I
Indianapolis 500 drivers
Sportspeople from Des Moines, Iowa
Racing drivers from Des Moines, Iowa
Racing drivers from Iowa
Civilians killed in World War I
American Red Cross personnel
American expatriates in France